Land and liberty or land and freedom may refer to:

Revolutionary campaigns
 Land and liberty (slogan) (Tierra y Libertad, Земля и Воля, Zemlya i Volya), a revolutionary slogan for freedom from landowners associated with the Russian and Mexican Revolutions
 Land and Liberty (Russia) (Zemlya i volya), a 19th-century Russian revolutionary secret society
 Land and Liberty (Poland), a 19th-century Russian campaign for Polish independence

Military
 Land and Freedom Column, Republican (anarchist) militia unit that fought in the Spanish Civil War
 Kenya Land and Freedom Army, 1950s guerilla army also known as the Mau Mau

Publications
 Land&Liberty, a quarterly magazine published by the Henry George Foundation of Great Britain
 Land and Liberty (newspaper), a defunct US anarchist periodical published circa 1914 to 1915
 Tierra y Libertad (newspaper), Spanish anarchist newspaper in the early 20th century (from 1930 published by Federación Anarquista Ibérica)

Other
 Land and Freedom (film), a translation of Tierra y Libertad, a 1995 film directed by Ken Loach about the Spanish Civil War
 Tierra y Libertad, a 2015 album by American hardcore punk band Xibalba
 Tierra y Libertad (political party), a leftist political party in Perú
 Nickname of the Mexican radio station XHTYL-FM
 Tierra y Libertad, Chiapas, a locality in Jiquipilas, Mexico